Manuel Cicconi (born 27 June 1997) is an Italian professional footballer who plays as a midfielder for  club Carrarese.

Career
Born and raised in Como, Cicconi started his career on his local club Como 1907, and made his debut for the club in the 2015–16 Serie B season. After 5 seasons on Como, Cicconi signed for Virtus Entella. He was loaned back to Como at the end of the 2019–20 Serie C.

On 26 January 2022, he joined Renate on loan.

On 1 September 2022, Cicconi signed a one-year contract with Carrarese.

References

External links

1997 births
Living people
Sportspeople from Como
Italian footballers
Association football midfielders
Serie B players
Serie C players
Serie D players
Como 1907 players
Virtus Entella players
A.C. Renate players
Carrarese Calcio players
Footballers from Lombardy